Hubertus Prinz von Sachsen-Coburg und Gotha (born 8 December 1961) is the eldest son of Ernst-Leopold Prinz von Sachsen-Coburg und Gotha (aka Prince Ernst Leopold of Saxe-Coburg and Gotha) and his first wife, Ingeborg Henig.

Background
Hubertus was born at Herrenberg, West Germany, during the Cold War when part of his family's hereditary lands, located in West Germany, were retained by the Coburgs, while other portions were behind the Iron Curtain.

His paternal grandfather, the Hereditary Prince Johann Leopold (1906–1972), had been heir-apparent to the sovereign Duchy of Saxe-Coburg and Gotha, but Johann Leopold's father, Duke Charles Edward, was the last prince of the House of Wettin to reign, abdicating on 14 November 1918 amidst the collapse of the German Empire at the end of World War I.

Johann Leopold renounced his claim as the deposed dynasty's heir on 27 February 1932, 15 days prior to his non-dynastic marriage to Baroness Feodora von der Horst (1905–1991). The Headship of the Coburg Wettins would thus pass to Johann Leopold's younger brother, Prince Friedrich Josias, who dynastically married a countess of a mediatized family. Before his death in 1954, Duke Charles Edward re-allocated the family's remaining fortune as an inheritance for their son and heir Andreas, Prince of Saxe-Coburg and Gotha.

Divorced from the baroness, Johann Leopold lived with his second wife, Maria Theresia Reindl, in Greinburg Castle, a Coburg property in Grein, Austria. Ernst-Leopold had been born in Hirschberg in Silesia, but Hubertus's parents' marriage and his birth took place in Herrenberg in Württemberg. His father's children by his second marriage were born in Regensburg, while Hubertus and his mother lived mostly in Bavaria following his parents' 1963 divorce.

Hubertus administers family properties and lives in Garmisch-Partenkirchen. He has five half-siblings: Viktoria, Ernst-Josias, Carl-Eduard, Ferdinand-Christian and Alice-Sybilla.

Marriage
On 9 March 1993 at Garmisch-Partenkirchen, Germany, Hubertus married Barbara Weissmann (b. Kaiserslautern, 21 May 1959), daughter of Eugen Weissmann and wife Renate Spettel. They were divorced in the same city 12 September 2012. They have one child, who lived with his mother : 
 Sebastian Hubertus Prinz von Sachsen-Coburg und Gotha (b. 1994)

References and sources

1961 births
Living people
People from Herrenberg
House of Saxe-Coburg and Gotha (United Kingdom)
Princes of Saxe-Coburg and Gotha